This is a list of flag bearers who have represented Paraguay at the Olympics.

Flag bearers carry the national flag of their country at the opening ceremony of the Olympic Games.

See also
Paraguay at the Olympics

References

Paraguay at the Olympics
Paraguay
Olympic flagbearers
Olympic flag bearers